Tichilești may refer to several populated places in Romania:

 Tichilești, a commune in Brăila County
 Tichilești, a village in Horia Commune, Constanța County
 Tichilești, Tulcea, a leper colony in Tulcea County